STS, or sts, may refer to:

Medicine
 Secondary traumatic stress, a condition which leads to a diminished ability to empathize
 Sequence-tagged site, a gene-reference in genomics
 Soft-tissue sarcoma
 Staurosporine, an antibiotic
 STS (gene), which codes for steroid sulfatase
 Superior temporal sulcus

Places
 Semipalatinsk Test Site for Soviet nuclear weapons
 Staffordshire, county in England, Chapman code

Transport
 Cadillac STS, a luxury car
 NASA Space Transportation System, the system in which the NASA shuttle is part of and only surviving component of; starting as a 1969 NASA proposal system for reusable space vehicles
 NASA Space Shuttle program, the shuttle program itself, whose mission were referred to with STS-numbering
 Sail training ship, a ship prefix
 Satellite Transit System, now called the SEA Underground, airport transit in Seattle-Tacoma International Airport
 Ship-to-ship transfer, between seagoing ships
 Société de transport de Sherbrooke, a public bus system in Sherbrooke, Quebec, Canada
 Société de transport du Saguenay, a public bus system in Saguenay, Quebec, Canada
 Sonar Technician Submarine, a US Navy rating
 STS, the IATA airport code for Charles M. Schulz - Sonoma County Airport
 STS, the National Rail code for Saltash railway station, Cornwall, UK

Science and technology 
 Space Tourism Society
 Scanning tunneling spectroscopy
 Science and technology studies, a.k.a. science, technology, and society
 Sociotechnical system
 Special treatment steel, used by the US Navy c.1910
 Static transfer switch, a semiconductor switch
 STS 5 an Australopithecus specimen
 Suomenkielisten teknikkojen seura, now incorporated into Academic Engineers and Architects in Finland TEK

Computing and communications
 HTTP Strict Transport Security
 Security token service, a web service
 Set Transmit State, hex 93 in the C1 set of control codes
 Spring Tool Suite, IDE for Spring Framework
 Station-to-Station protocol, a cryptographic key agreement scheme
 Synergy Teleconferencing System, a PC-based chat server
 Serviciul de Telecomunicaţii Speciale, the Romanian special telecommunication service
 STS Relay, US speech to speech relay service for people with a speech disability
 STS (TV channel), Russia
 Synchronous transport signal, in synchronous optical networking
 Saga Television Station, a Japanese commercial broadcaster

Culture 
 Satanas, a Filipino-American gang
 Stepover toehold sleeper, a wrestling hold
 S.T.S., an Austropop band

Societies, organizations and companies 
 Scottish Tartans Society, a defunct Scottish society
 Sisu Terminal Systems, a former terminal tractor producer
 Society of the Holy Trinity (Societas Trinitatis Sanctae – STS), Lutheran ministerium
 Suomen Työväen Säästöpankki, a defunct Finnish commercial bank
 Hitachi Rail STS, formerly known as Ansaldo STS, a company specializing in railway signalling and control systems

Other uses 
 Saints, the plural of Saint, for example: Sts. Peter and Paul
 Short-term business statistics
 Strathcona-Tweedsmuir School, Alberta, Canada
 Susquehannock Trail System, Pennsylvania, US

See also